The 2016 Parramatta Eels season was the 70th in the club's history. Coached by Brad Arthur and co-captained by Kieran Foran and Tim Mannah, they competed in the NRL's 2016 Telstra Premiership.

Summary
Prior to the start of the 2016 NRL season, the Parramatta club faced the prospect with starting the season on -4 points due to salary cap indiscretions in 2015, however the NRL was satisfied with governance changes at Parramatta and no points were deducted.

Parramatta started the season with a 17-4 loss against the previous years runners up in Brisbane. The club would win their following three matches in a row including a 20-16 victory over the reigning premiers North Queensland. On 3 May 2016, NRL CEO Todd Greenberg announced that the club would be docked the twelve competition points they have accrued so far this season, as well as fined $1 million and stripped of the 2016 NRL Auckland Nines title it won in February. In addition, the NRL also announced that the Parramatta club would not be able to accrue any further competition points until they fell under the salary cap, which they were reported to be $500,000. Five officials, including chairman Steve Sharp, deputy chairman Tom Issa, director Peter Serrao, chief executive John Boulous and football manager Daniel Anderson, were also sacked.

On 9 July 2016, after over two months of club officials contesting the preliminary penalties, Parramatta were handed their punishment with the addition of their for/against points tally accumulated from rounds 1-9 being deducted. At the time of the points deduction, Parramatta sat just outside the top four on the table.
Although the points deduction had been handed down, Parramatta were still mathematically able to make the finals if they could win 12 of their remaining 15 games. The first match after Parramatta were stripped of the competition points was against South Sydney at Parramatta Stadium. Parramatta would narrowly lose the match 22-20. It was around this time that star recruit Kieran Foran was released by the club having just played nine games due to personal reasons and multiple off-field issues.

On 29 August 2016, Parramatta played their final ever game in the top grade at Parramatta Stadium against St. George Illawarra as it had been announced earlier the club would move into a new ground which would later be known as the Western Sydney Stadium. Parramatta would win the game 30-18 with Bevan French scoring a hat-trick. Parramatta finished the season with a 40-18 victory over the New Zealand Warriors to finish 14th on the table.

Standings

National Rugby League

National Youth Competition

Fixtures

Auckland Nines

Pre-season

Home and away season

Players and staff

First grade staff
This section lists players who were in Parramatta's first grade squad at any point during the 2016 season
Asterisks indicates player left mid-season
Caret symbol indicates player joined mid-season
Hash symbol indicates player retired mid-season

Coaching staff
This section lists members of staff who were in Parramatta's first grade squad at any point during the 2016 season
Asterisks indicate member of staff left mid-season

Transfers
In:

Out:

Representative call-ups

Domestic

International

References

Parramatta Eels seasons
Parramatta Eels season